Bigg Boss Non-Stop is a spin-off Indian Telugu-language reality digital series of the show Bigg Boss, that airs exclusively on Disney Star's streaming service platform Disney+ Hotstar with host Nagarjuna. The first season of the show is scheduled to premiere on 26 February 2022.

On 24 December 2021, In an official press interaction with media, the makers announced Bigg Boss Telugu OTT will be set to be streamed soon and also said the digital version of the show is going to be different from its television counterpart. On 9 February 2022, Disney+ Hotstar revealed the show's title along with a new logo.

Concept
As in the televised series, the group of contestants—referred to as Housemates—are enclosed in the Bigg Boss Non-Stop House under constant surveillance of cameras and microphones. Unlike the main edition, this spin-off will be airing 24/7 live streaming and a one-hour main coverage episode will be daily telecast on Disney+ Hotstar.

Development
The spin-off edition was officially announced by the host Nagarjuna in the grand finale of Bigg Boss Telugu 5 that the next season will start in a couple of months. Further details about its launch, format, and contestants are expected to be revealed soon.

Broadcasts
There was no television coverage for this edition; instead, it would be completely streamed online at Disney+ Hotstar for 24*7 coverage.

House
The location for the house is still set to remain at Annapurna Studios like how it did for the original series. However minor changes and renovation is done to the house for this edition.

Series overview

Housemate pattern

Bigg Boss Non-Stop Buzzz
Bigg Boss Non-Stop Buzzz is an Indian Telugu-Indian language Reality Talk show with evicted housemates of reality television series Bigg Boss Non-Stop show. The show features the evicted housemates interviews with a previous season's contestant as a host and it will be aired on Disney+ Hotstar.

References

External links 
 Official Website

 
Bigg Boss (Telugu TV series)
Telugu-language television shows
Indian reality television series 
Telugu-language web series
2022 web series debuts
Telugu-language Disney+ Hotstar original programming